Jayakody Arachchige Don Edward Timothy Jayakody (Sinhala:එඩ්වඩ් ජයකොඩි: born 6 April 1952), popularly as Edward Jayakody, is a Sri Lankan musician, singer and composer. Jayakody has directed the music for hundreds of Sinhala films and television serials and has also composed many songs for children's programming ("Koppara Koppara").

Jayakody won the Swarna Sanka Award in 1987 for Best Male Singer for the film Gedara Budun Amma. He won Best Music Director in 1979 and 1980 for the plays Nidane and Aparadaya Saha Danduwama.

Personal life
Jayakody was born on 6 April 1952 as the youngest child with six siblings of Don Raphial Jayakody and Victoria Jayakody in Hettimulla, Kegalle, Sri Lanka. His mother died on 29 April 2017. Jayakody received his early education at Bandaranaike Junior School, and received his secondary education at St. Mary's College, Kegalle of Kegalle. He joined the church choir while attending Bandaranaike and learned music while at St. Mary's, under teacher H. Samarapala. 

Jayakody is married to popular songstress Charitha Priyadarshani where the wedding was celebrated on 17 January 1991. The couple has one son, Chandeepa and one daughter, Sharanya Rasodi. Chandeepa got engaged to Deshaki de Silva. To celebrate 25th wedding anniversary, Jayakody and Charitha remarried on same date.

Music career
During the period from 1968 to 1976, Jayakody participated in the "Maliban Guwan Thotilla" and many amateur music programs. He entered the Government College of Music in 1976 (presently the Faculty of Aesthetic Education of Kelaniya University) and during that time took part in music programs conducted by popular musicians. In 1976, he sang on the popular radio program "Pibidena Gayaka Parapura" on the radio, and he won second place in the grand finale of the program. He entered singing with the song Karadiya Gambare for a 1977 radio musical program. Its lyrics are by Premakumara Jayawardena and the music was composed by Rohana Weerasinghe. 

During 1980s, he released two cassettes and a CD, Seethala Pinimatha, Kerakena Rode and Samanalaya Mala Ha Lamaya. He also holds a government position as Educational Assistant Music Director. Jayakody made several children songs such as Kopara Kopara, Katu Akule, Rajjuruwo Udai, Sulangak Vee and Chakgudu Gudu. At the same time, he was appointed as the Music Teacher at Nalanda College, where he worked for a while and then transferred to Gurukula College, Kelaniya. In 1986, Jayakody was promoted to Staff Education Officer in the Music Division and attached to the Ministry of Education. Around the same time, he unveiled his second album Kerakena Rode. He received his Master's degree in 1992 from the Bhatkhande Music Institute Deemed University, Lucknow.

Apart from singing, he composed and worked as the music director for more than fifty-two singers. He also composed music for a number of stage plays and teledramas. He has performed as an actor in seventeen stage plays including maiden acting in 1975 stage play Spartacus and then in Kontha Nona, Angara Ganga Galabhasi, Mawatha Api, Sekkuwa, Nari Bena, Gajaman Puwatha, Oedipus and Satara Waram Raja Daruwo. In 2010, Jayakody and Charitha organized a musical tour titled Wasanthaye Aga to Europe from October 16. In 2019, Sabaragamuwa University of Sri Lanka conferred a lifetime achievement award for Jayakody for his contribution to the Sri Lankan music industry.

He has contributed playback singing to several films, including Seilama, Gedara Buddha Amma, Mangala Thagga, Himagira, Saroja and Kiri Kawadi. He made maiden cinema appearance in the musical film Guththila with the titular role. Jayakody's album Deduna Palama was released on April 6, 2003.  

Jayakody has performed his solo musical concert titled Marambari since January 2010. So far, 13 Marambari concerts have been held in Italy alone. The series was a huge success in Canada, London, France, Australia, New Zealand, Dubai and the United States.  In November 2017, Marambari concert was held at Apeksha Hospital, Maharagama. The tenth anniversary of Jayakody's Marambari solo concert was held on the evening of the 31 January 2020 at the Bandaranaike Memorial Conference Hall, Colombo.

References

External links
Music and drama brought them together
තාත්තයි අම්මයි - පුතයි එකම වේදිකාවක
විශාරද එඩ්වඩ් ජයකොඩිගේ දස වසරක මාරම්බරී සුගැයුම
එඩ්වඩ් ජයකොඩි මාරම්බරී 100
මාරම්බරීට 100 යි එඩ්වඩ් - චරිතා යුවළගේ පුතයි දුවයි වේදිකාවට
මාරම්බරී ප්‍රසංගයට රුපියල් 100000 පරිත්‍යාගයක්
මාරම්බරී වේදිකාවට ආවේ වසර තිස් පහකට පසු
සතියේ මියුසික් වීඩියෝව
මාරම්බරීට 100යි - අද හොදම දවස ඔබ එනවා නම්

Living people
1952 births
20th-century Sri Lankan male singers
Sri Lankan Roman Catholics
Faculty of Nalanda College, Colombo
Sinhalese singers
Kala Suri